Sha Yexin (13 July 1939 in Nanjing – 26 July 2018) was a Chinese playwright and short story writer.

Sha finished his first one-act play, Yi fen qian 《一分钱》 (One Cent), in 1965. Later works include his plays Haohao xuexi 《好好学习》 (Diligent study);  Yesu, Kongzi, Pitoushi Lienong 耶稣·孔子·披头士列侬 (Jesus, Confucius and Beatles‘ Lennon);  Makesi mishi 《马克思秘史》 (Marx's Secret History);  Xunzhao nanzihan 《寻找男子汉》 (Looking for a Real Man) and his short story titled Wu biaoti de duihua 《无标题对话》 (Untitled dialogue). His play The Impostor 《假如我是真的》 (If I Were for Real) was written together with fellow playwrights Li Shoucheng and Yao Mingde and later made into a movie directed by Wang Tong.

Sha became head of the Shanghai People's Art Theatre in 1985.

Sha met with German chancellor Angela Merkel in 2007, regarding freedom of the press issues in China.

References 

1939 births
2018 deaths
Chinese dramatists and playwrights
Charter 08 signatories
People's Republic of China writers
Writers from Nanjing
Shanghai Theatre Academy alumni